al-Samarqandi or Samarqandi is a nisba meaning "from Samarqand", a city in Central Asia (Greater Persia), in modern Uzbekistan. It may refer to:

 Abd Allāh ibn ‘Abd ar-Raḥmān ad-Dārimi as-Samarqandī, known as al-Darimi, 9th-century Muslim scholar and imam
 Abu Bakr al-Samarqandi (d. 268/881–2) a Sunni-Hanafi theologian who was polemicising against Ibn Karram's theology
 Abu Mansur al-Maturidi (853–944), also al-Samarqandi, 9th-century Sunni Hanafi jurist, theologian, and scriptural exegete
 Al-Hakim al-Samarqandi (d. 342/953), student of al-Maturidi and qadi of Samarqand
 Abu al-Layth al-Samarqandi (d. 373/983), Hanafi scholar
 Shams al-Din al-Samarqandi (d. 702/1302), Hanafi-Maturidi theologian, astronomer and mathematician, author of al-Saha'if al-Ilahiyyah
 Nizami Aruzi Samarqandi (fl. 1110–1161), 12th-century Persian poet and prose writer
 Fatima al-Samarqandi, 12th-century female Muslim scholar and jurist
 Suzani Samarqandi (died 1166), 12th-century Persian poet
 Abd-al-Razzāq Samarqandī (1413–1482), 15th-century Timurid chronicler and Islamic scholar
 Najib ad-Din Samarqandi (died 1222), 13th-century physician
 Athir al-Din al-Abhari, also al-Samaqandi, 13th-century philosopher, astronomer, astrologer and mathematician
 Qāzī Abd as-Salām Samarqandī, a 16-century scholar and father of the Sufi saint Khwaja Baqi Billah
 Sipandi Samarkandi (1829–1909), 19th-century Tajik bilingual poet
  (b. 1657), Tajik poet

Nisbas
People from Samarkand